M JO is a fashion label created by Taiwanese singer and actor Jiro Wang on 14 February 2010, in collaboration with Dong Cheng Wei members Shu and Deng. The label's slogan is "Enjoy Love, Life, and Peace." As a design graduate of Fu Shin Trade and Arts College (Taiwan) with a degree in Advertising Design, Wang is personally involved with designing the caps, clothing, and accessories, which are characterized by bold, vibrant, and colorful designs.

In 2014, M JO's creator and designer Jiro Wang designed an exhibit for World Trade Centre (Hong Kong), in line with the 2014 FIFA World Cup and to celebrate the label's upcoming 5th anniversary, where Wang's artwork, M JO products, and the label's iconic JO robot went on display from 30 May to 17 July 2014. Wang's interest in elements of fantasy and science fiction gave rise to the exhibit's conceptual use of oversized gear wheels, planetary motions, and spaceships, amidst a cosmic backdrop. Street fashion was also a crucial thematic element.    

M JO has also collaborated with fashion labels such as the U.S.-based New Era Cap Company, South Korean fashion label Dolly & Molly, Japanese fashion label Shine, as well as other Taiwanese celebrity fashion lines, such as those belonging to Darren Qiu and Fahrenheit (Taiwanese band) mate Calvin Chen.

In November 2014, Wang was invited to design a series of virtual stickers/large-sized emoji for Line (application), making him the first Taiwanese celebrity to design purchasable stickers for the company. Using his fashion line M JO's iconic JO robot as his theme, he designed the "M JO - JO Robot" series of 40 virtual stickers, which was released in LINE's sticker store on 24 April 2015. Hand-drawn before they were transformed into computer graphics, the virtual stickers also incorporate popular contemporary Mandarin and Taiwanese dialect neologisms.

References

External links
M JO Official Website

2010s fashion
Taiwanese companies established in 2010
Companies of Taiwan